Ibon Ruiz Sedano (born 30 January 1999) is a Spanish cyclist, who currently rides for UCI ProTeam .

Major results
2018
 1st Laudio Saria
 1st Stage 3 Vuelta a Zamora
2021
 1st  Mountains classification, Volta a la Comunitat Valenciana

References

External links

1999 births
Living people
Spanish male cyclists
Cyclists from the Basque Country (autonomous community)
Sportspeople from Vitoria-Gasteiz